Goiás Esporte Clube is a Brazilian sports club, best known for its association football team, located in the city of Goiânia, capital city of the Brazilian state of Goiás. Goiás has won Brazilian's second tier Série B twice, also 28 Campeonato Goiano and 3 Copa Centro-Oeste. Goiás' football team has been a mainstay in premiere Brazilian league Série A and has been promoted to Latin America's Copa Libertadores twice and South America's Copa Sudamericana six times. Its main rivals are Vila Nova, Atlético Goianiense and Goiânia. Goiás has a wide advantage in matches between the two teams.

History
On 6 April 1943, in a meeting among friends at Lino Barsi's home, Goiás Esporte Clube was founded. In 1973, the team was promoted to the first division of Campeonato Brasileiro. In 1998, the team joined the Clube dos 13 (Clube dos 13 is an organization composed by the greatest teams of Brazil). They won the Série B in 1999 and 2012.

Stadium

Goiás' stadium is Serrinha, with a maximum capacity of 14,450 people. However, the club plays several matches at Estádio Serra Dourada, built in 1975, with a maximum capacity of 50,049 people.

Support

Fanbase size
In its first year of existence, it was said that Goiás had only 33 fans.

It is currently the football club with the largest number of fans in Goiás, the North and Midwest regions of Brazil, according to a survey conducted by the Gallup Institute, Placar, Serpes, and Pluri Consultoria.

Esmeraldino of Central Brazil was found to have the 16th largest number of fans in Brazil, with 1.6 million fans.

Ultras

Força Jovem Goiás

Founded on May 23, 1997, from the extinction of the Green Hell, with the goal of creating an association of fans that really loved Goiás. Jovem Goiás fans managed to win the support and respect among all the emerald, thus becoming the most vibrant and passionate, which now has approximately 12,000 fans.

Headquarters Serrinha
Administrative Headquarters

 Serrinha Stadium (Stadium Haile Pinheiro): capacity: 9.900 spectators.
 Gymnasium covered with capacity for 3,000 people.
 Complete structure of concentration for the athletes.
 2 grasslands training for students of the Little School Sports Initiation.
 A 25m swimming pool and indoor semi-Olympic heated for Sports Initiation.
 Parking for 300 vehicles.
 2 sand courts for volleyball and lighted futvôlei.
 Runs to 1-kilometer jogging.
 Area available for conduct of parties.

Edmo Pinheiro Sports and Recreation Center
Park Anhanguera

 4 grasslands officers.
 Changing rooms with custom closets (with photo of each player), air conditioning, showers, hot tubs, and special chairs.
 Technical Committee room with computers, TV and DVD and meeting table, besides an exclusive locker room with shower and toilet.
 Medical Department
 Gym
 Recreation area with kiosk and barbecue.
 3 football fields.
 Lake natural.
The mini-forest with native trees.
 Playground amusement.

Coimbra Bueno Center
Aparecida de Goiânia

 Training Center.
 Assistance to needy children in the south, and Goiânia.
 Jogging track.
 200 grasslands.

Honors

Domestic competitions
Série B
Winners (2): 1999, 2012
Runner-up (1): 1994

Campeonato Goiano
Winners (28): 1966, 1971, 1972, 1975, 1976, 1981, 1983, 1986, 1987, 1989, 1990, 1991, 1994, 1996, 1997, 1998, 1999, 2000, 2002, 2003, 2006, 2009, 2012, 2013, 2015, 2016, 2017, 2018

 Copa Centro-Oeste
Winners (3): 2000, 2001, 2002

Copa do Brasil
Runner-up (1): 1990

International
Copa Sudamericana
Runner-up (1): 2010

Statistics

Campeonato Brasileiro Série A record

Copa Libertadores record

Copa Sudamericana record

Players

First team squad

Reserve team

Out on loan

Technical staff
Manager: Guto Ferreira
Assistant manager: Alexandre Faganello, André Luís, Emerson Ávila
Fitness coach: Valdir Júnior, Ednilson Sena, Leandro Campos, Álvaro Henrique
Goalkeeping coaches: Edimar Torquato, Flávio Mendes

Managers

 Zé Mário (1987–88)
 Luiz Felipe Scolari (1988)
 Roberto Oliveira (1990)
 Zé Mário (1991–92)
 Arthur Bernardes (1992)
 Roberval Davino (1993)
 Mauro Fernandes (1993–95)
 Hélio dos Anjos (1995)
 Carlos Alberto Silva (1997–98)
 Gílson Nunes (1998)
 Hélio dos Anjos (1999–01)
 Lori Sandri (2001)
 Hélio dos Anjos (2001–02)
 Vica (2002)
 Nelsinho Baptista (Aug 27, 2002 – June 18, 2003)
 Edinho (Aug 27, 2002 – June 15, 2003)
 Cuca (May 26, 2003 – Dec 13, 2003)
 Ivo Wortmann (Dec 16, 2003 – Feb 27, 2004)
 Celso Roth (March 30, 2004 – Dec 19, 2004)
 Péricles Chamusca (Jan 1, 2005 – April 24, 2005)
 Edson Gaúcho (April 24, 2005 – July 17, 2005)
 Geninho (July 18, 2005 – May 10, 2006)
 Antônio Lopes (May 12, 2006 – Aug 14, 2006)
 Geninho (Aug 14, 2006 – May 6, 2007)
 Wanderley Filho (int.) (May 1, 2007 – May 12, 2007)
 Paulo Bonamigo (May 11, 2007 – Sept 15, 2007)
 Márcio Araújo (Sept 20, 2007 – Nov 29, 2007)
 Cassius Hartmann (int.) (Dec 1, 2007 – Dec 31, 2007)
 Caio Júnior (Jan 6, 2008 – May 5, 2008)
 Vadão (May 7, 2008 – June 15, 2008)
 Hélio dos Anjos (June 15, 2008 – Jan 25, 2010)
 Jorginho Cantinflas (Jan 25, 2010 – April 20, 2010)
 Émerson Leão (April 26, 2010 – Aug 27, 2010)
 Jorginho (Aug 29, 2010 – Nov 9, 2010)
 Arthur Neto (Nov 9, 2010 – June 28, 2011)
 Márcio Goiano (2011)
 Ademir Fonseca (2011)
 Enderson Moreira (2011–13)
 Claudinei Oliveira (2014)
 Ricardo Drubscky (2014)
 Wagner Lopes (2015)
 Hélio dos Anjos (2015)
 Julinho Camargo (2015)
 Arthur Neto (2015)
 Danny Sérgio (2015)
 Enderson Moreira (2016)
 Léo Condé (2016)
 Gilson Kleina (2016–17)
 Sérgio Soares (2017)
 Sílvio Criciúma (2017)
 Argel Fucks (2017)
 Sílvio Criciúma (2017)
 Hélio dos Anjos (2017–18)
 Ney Franco (2018)
 Mauricio Barbieri (2019)
 Claudinei Oliveira (2019)
 Ney Franco (2019–20)
 Thiago Larghi (2020)
 Enderson Moreira (2020)
 Augusto César (2020–21)
 Glauber Ramos (interim; 2021)
 Pintado (2021)
 Marcelo Cabo (2021)
 Glauber Ramos (interim; 2021–22)
 Bruno Pivetti (2022)
 Glauber Ramos (interim; 2022)
 Jair Ventura (2022)
 Guto Ferreira (2023–)

References

External links

Goiás Official Web Site 
Goiás Selection of Young Players

 
Association football clubs established in 1943
Football clubs in Goiás
1943 establishments in Brazil